Harvey Gilman Whitlock (1809–1874) was an early member of the Latter Day Saint movement and one of the witnesses to the Book of Commandments. He was among those Latter Day Saints driven by mobs from Jackson County, Missouri, in the summer of 1833. From 1835 he was in and out of multiple Latter Day Saint groups several times.

David Whitmer, an original witness of the golden plates and later president of the Church of Christ (Whitmerite), claimed in his pamphlet "An Address to All Believers in Christ" that the devil caught Whitlock after he was ordained to be a high priest to show "God's displeasure was upon their works".

Whitlock was a native of Massachusetts. He joined Joseph Smith's Church of Christ by 1831 and was an early missionary in Amherst, Ohio. Whitlock was among those who were directed to go to Missouri by a revelation of Smith. He later returned to Ohio and then moved his family to Missouri. He was viewed as such a leader in the church that he was specifically targeted for early expulsion from Missouri.

In 1835, Whitlock was excommunicated. In November 1835, he sent a letter expressing repentance to Smith and Smith directed Whitlock to come to Kirtland, Ohio. In January 1836, Whitlock was rebaptized at Kirtland and restored to his priesthood.

Whitlock again withdrew from the church in 1838. In 1846, he became a member of Sidney Rigdon's church. By 1850, Whitlock was in Salt Lake City, but there is no record of his having been joined the Utah-based Church of Jesus Christ of Latter-day Saints (LDS Church) until 1858. Whitlock was excommunicated by the LDS Church in 1859. In 1864, Whitlock moved to California, where he became the head of the Pacific Slope Region of the Reorganized Church of Jesus Christ of Latter Day Saints (RLDS Church). In 1868, Whitlock was excommunicated by the RLDS Church.

Notes

References
Saints without halos bio
Mormon Times, Oct. 27, 2009 article on witnesses of the Book of Commandments

1809 births
1874 deaths
American Latter Day Saint leaders
American Latter Day Saint missionaries
American leaders of the Community of Christ
Converts to Mormonism
Doctrine and Covenants people
People excommunicated by the Church of Jesus Christ of Latter-day Saints
People excommunicated by the Church of Christ (Latter Day Saints)
People excommunicated by the Community of Christ
People from Amherst, Ohio
Rigdonites